Qader Marz, also known as Qader Maz or Qadir Maz, may refer to:
 Qader Marz, Kermanshah
 Qader Marz, Kurdistan